Anthony Negrete (born February 24, 1987), better known by his stage names Speak! and Speakz, is an American rapper and songwriter from Los Angeles, California. He is known for having co-written the 2011 song "Gucci Gucci" performed by Kreayshawn and collaborating with various Odd Future members such as Mike G and Syd tha Kyd, who recorded his 2011 album Inside Out Boy. He is based out of Mexico City.

Discography

Extended plays
 Beautiful Sounds For Interesting People With Fantastic Taste (2010)
 Summer Time Radness (2014)
 Sex Quest (2014)
 Sex Quest 2 (2015)
 Sex Quest 3 (2015)
 Fall Time Radness (2015)
 My Lonely Primavera (2017)
 A Man + His Plants  (2018)
 Singularity (2019)

Mixtapes
 Inside Out Boy (2011)
 Gnarly Davidson vs. the Marlboro Men (2014)
 Inside Out Boy B-Sides & Bootlegs (2014)
 Speakpanther (with Dream Panther) (2017)

Guest appearances

References

Living people
1987 births
American male rappers
Rappers from California
People from Moreno Valley, California
American people of Jewish descent
West Coast hip hop musicians
Alternative hip hop musicians
21st-century American rappers
21st-century American male musicians